Yuko Sato or Yūko Satō may refer to:

, Japanese racewalker
, Japanese politician
, Japanese voice actress

See also
Yuka Sato (born 1973), Japanese figure skater
Yuka Sato (triathlete) (born 1992), Japanese triathlete
Yuka Sato (sprinter) (born 1981), Japanese sprinter
Yuka Sato (javelin thrower) (born 1992), Japanese javelin thrower